Macroglossum jani is a moth of the  family Sphingidae. It is known from the Philippines.

It is extremely similar to Macroglossum clemensi, but the forewing pattern is somewhat more dull. Furthermore, the pale scaling along the oblique median band and submarginal line is very faint or even absent.

References

Macroglossum
Moths described in 1998